Lights Out is the third full-length studio album by Swedish hard rock band Graveyard. It was released on 26 October 2012.

Release
Graveyard revealed an artwork for their album cover on 20 August 2012. An interactive teaser video was released by the group via YouTube on 22 October 2012.

Track listing
An Industry of Murder (4:02)
Slow Motion Countdown (5:35)
Seven Seven (2:33)
The Suits, the Law & the Uniforms (4:50)
Endless Night (2:46)
Hard Times Lovin' (4:27)
Goliath (2:49)
Fool In the End (3:31)
20/20 (Tunnel Vision) (5:00)

Charts

Weekly charts

Year-end charts

References

Graveyard (band) albums
2012 albums